A construction battalion is a kind of military battalion that is formally designated to engage in construction, and particularly in the building of structures for military use. Examples of construction battalions include:

Naval mobile construction battalion, US Navy
Amphibious Construction Battalion, US Navy
371st Engineer Construction Battalion, US Army
No. 2 Construction Battalion, Canadian Expeditionary Force
Construction battalion (Soviet Union)
Bau-Bataillon (Nazi Germany)
Luftwaffen-Bau-Bataillon
Litauische Bau-Bataillon 
Ost-Bau-Pionier-Bataillon 559
Bau-Bataillon 87
Bau-Bataillon 121 
 Bau-Bataillon 306

See also
Bausoldat, German Democratic Republic
Labour battalion
Pioneer (military)